Noor Effandi bin Ahmad is a Malaysian politician who served as Member of the Melaka State Legislative Assembly (MLA) for Telok Mas from May 2018 to November 2021 and Member of the Malacca State Executive Council (EXCO) from May 2018 to March 2020 for the first time and again from March 2020 to his resignation in October 2021.

The 2020 Malaysian political crisis dubbed 'Sheraton Move', which overthrew the PH state administration, which he had followed suit. During his only MLA tenure, he served two times as member of EXCO, from May 2018 to March 2020 for the first time under PH and again from March 2020 to October 2021 for the second time under BN-PN administrations.

On 5 October 2021, BERSATU membership of Noor Effandi was automatically dropped for blatantly stating his loss of support for the BN state government under Chief Minister Sulaiman Md Ali. He and three other MLAs also withdrew support for the Malacca state government, triggering the state assembly dissolution and subsequent snap 2021 Malacca state election. His attempt to return to PH and contest in the state election under its banner was rejected by the coalition, he decided not to defend the seat and remain as an Independent after his twice defections. On 19 May 2022, he join Amanah.

Election results

Honours

Honours of Malaysia 
 Malacca:
  Companion Class I of the Order of Malacca (DMSM) – Datuk (2019)

References

External links
 

Living people
Year of birth missing (living people)
People from Johor
Malaysian people of Malay descent
Malaysian Muslims
Independent politicians in Malaysia
Former Malaysian United Indigenous Party politicians
National Trust Party (Malaysia) politicians
Members of the Malacca State Legislative Assembly
Malacca state executive councillors
21st-century Malaysian politicians